Qingdao Airlines is a startup Chinese airline that commenced operations on 26 April 2014. The carrier is based at Qingdao Jiaodong International Airport.

History
An application for the establishment of an airline based in the Shandong province was filed with the Civil Aviation Administration of China (CAAC) by the Yantai-based Nanshan Group in May 2013. Approval was received by the CAAC between that month and June 2013, when Qingdao Airlines was formed.

Corporate affairs

Ownership
Initially, the airline was owned by the Nanshan Group (55%), the Qingdao Transport Development Group (QTDG) (25%) and Shandong Airlines (20%). The initial capital of Qingdao Airlines was CNY1 billion (USD161 million). Since November 2015, Qingdao Airlines was fully owned by Nanshan Group.

Key people
, Song Zuowen was the president of the airline.

Headquarters
The airline's headquarters are in Chengyang District, Qingdao.

Destinations
Operations started on  linking Qingdao with Chengdu. , the airline top five routes ranked by seat capacity were Qingdao–Shanghai, Qingdao–Beijing, Qingdao–Hangzhou, Qingdao–Shenyang and Qingdao–Dalian. , Qingdao Airlines served the following destinations:

Qingdao Airlines operates to the following destinations (as of July 2019):

The airline originally aimed to become a ″boutique airline″ and had plans to start services to Shenzhen and Shenyang in the near future; Guangzhou and Shanghai were expected to be served in the longer term.

Fleet

, Qingdao Airlines fleet consists of the following aircraft:

In September 2013, an order for  Airbus A320s and 18 A320neos was placed in a deal valued at USD2.5 billion. The carrier phased in its first aircraft, a 152-seater Airbus A320, in early April 2014. The carrier took ownership of its first two A320neos in October 2018. Qingdao Airlines planned to expand its fleet to 60 aircraft by 2020.

References

External links
 Qingdao Airlines 

Airlines of China
Airlines established in 2013
Companies based in Qingdao
Chinese companies established in 2013